John W. Adams (July 4, 1862June 25, 1939) was an American farmer and Democratic politician.  He was a member of the Wisconsin State Assembly, representing Kewaunee County in the 1899 session.  He was also chairman of the Kewaunee County board in 1893–1894.

Biography
John W. Adams was born in Kewaunee, Wisconsin, and lived almost his entire life in that vicinity.  He was educated in the Kewaunee area public schools and then attended Lawrence University.  From age 16, he worked as a teacher for several years, but later purchased a plot of land just outside the southern limits of the city and took up farming.

He served on the Kewaunee town board for many years, and was chairman of the town board.  He also was selected as chairman of the county board of supervisors in 1893.  In 1898, he was elected to the Wisconsin State Assembly from the Kewaunee district.  He defeated Republican John L. Haney with 55% of the vote and did not run for another term in 1900.

Personal life and family
John W. Adams died at his home in Kewaunee on June 25, 1939, after a brief illness.  He was survived by his wife and one son.

References

1862 births
1939 deaths
Lawrence University alumni
People from Kewaunee, Wisconsin
County supervisors in Wisconsin
Democratic Party members of the Wisconsin State Assembly
19th-century American politicians